Ricardo Héctor Zunino (born 13 April 1949 in San Juan) is a former racing driver from Argentina who participated in Formula One from  to . He competed in 11 World Championship races and two non-Championship Formula One races, the 1980 Spanish Grand Prix and 1981 South African Grand Prix.

At the 1979 Canadian Grand Prix, he replaced Niki Lauda at Brabham after the Austrian abruptly quit the team and Formula One. Zunino, attending the race as a spectator on a weekend off from his regular British F1 Championship drive, was chosen to take over the seat, having recently tested for the team. After the 1980 French Grand Prix he was replaced by Héctor Rebaque.

In Argentina, he was two-time Turismo Nacional champion, with Fiat.

Racing record

Complete European Formula Two Championship results
(key) (Races in bold indicate pole position; races in italics indicate fastest lap)

Complete British Formula One Championship results
(key) (note: results shown in bold indicate pole position; results in italics indicate fastest lap)

Complete Formula One World Championship results
(key) (Races in bold indicate pole position / Races in italics indicate fastest lap)

References

Profile at grandprix.com

1949 births
Living people
Sportspeople from San Juan Province, Argentina
Argentine racing drivers
Argentine Formula One drivers
European Formula Two Championship drivers
Brabham Formula One drivers
Tyrrell Formula One drivers
British Formula One Championship drivers
People from San Juan, Argentina